Madhogarh Fort is a fort located on top of Madhogarh Hill in the Aravalli mountain range, near Madhogarh village, in the Mahendragarh district of Haryana state in India.

In the Madhogarh village, there are several old havelis of interest to tourists, built in the vernacular Hindu architecture in the style of Shekhawato havelis.

History 
Madhogarh founded by Madho Singh I in the first half of the 18th century, when he placed the area under the control of Balwant Singh. The fort is named after Madho Singh I; "Madhogarh" literally means "the fort of Madho". Around 1755, this area passed from the Rajputs to the Maratha Empire under Maharaja Khande Rao Holkar of Indore when he attacked the independent Mughal chieftain Ismail Beg, Ismail Beg escaped to Madhogarh and established a post near Madhogarh fort. Khande Rao Holkar attacked Madhogargh fort and captured it on 16 February 1792. Ismail Beg escaped and attacked Kanud when the ruling wife of already deceased Nawab Najaf Quli Khan had died. Khande Rao Holkar then attacked Kanud and captured Ismail Beg, imprisoned him at Agra Fort and put him to death in 1794. Maratha Maharaj Mahadaji Shinde (Scindia) of Gwalior had conquered Rania, Fatehabad and Sirsa from Bhatti Rajput Muslims. Haryana came under Maratha Empire. Mahad Ji divided Haryana in four territories: Delhi (Mughal emperor Shah Alam II, his family and areas surrounding Delhi), Panipat (Karnal, Sonepat, Kurukshetra and Ambala), Hisar (Hisar, Sirsa, Fatehabad, parts of Rohtak), Ahirwal (Gurugram, Rewari, Narnaul, Mahendragarh) and Mewat. Daulat Rao Scindia ceded Haryana on 30 December 1803 under the Treaty of Surji-Anjangaon to British East India Company's Company rule in India. It is very important from the point of view of tourism, it would be better to go here during the time of rain and winter, it is also called "Mini Musuri" of local area during foggy session. According to the information received from the bujurg people, this fort was built in 16-17 AD and Swai Madho Singh built it for take rest between Jaipur and Delhi, and the village was named Madhogadh in his name. At that time, Madhogarh trade point between Delhi and Jaipur was strong. There are still many havelis of Baniyas (Business men) built below the hill. In which the film also shooted titled "Jalpari".

Architecture 

The fort is one of only a few hill forts in Haryana. The architecture is of Hindu Rajput origin.

From the perspective of defence, it is hard to access fort and stairs were formed by cutting the rocks in the hills. It has two portions: an upper section on top of the hill, with a ruined main structure, and a smaller section just below the top of the hill. The fort is surrounded by a high and thick wall around the hill with several bastions. Below the sections of the fort, there is a water tank that still stands. The upper complex has a few chambers that appear to be connected to the water tank.

Conservation and further development 
The Government of Haryana plans to develop an integrated tourist resort incorporating the Madhogarh fort. Both Mahendragarh fort and Madhogarh fort are being restored along the lines of Pinjore Gardens to develop them as the international tourist destination as part of Rewari-Narnaul-Mahendragarh-Madhogarh tourist circuit, and of the INR 100 crore an initial amount of INR 30 crore was already released for the Madhogarh fort in fy2018-19.

In popular culture
Owing to its picturesque location, several movies including Kaun Kitne Paani Mein and Jalpari: The Desert Mermaid were shot here, as was Aditya Narayan's popular Haryanvi song "git pit git pit".

See also
 Nangal Sirohi

References 

Forts in Haryana
Mahendragarh district
Archaeological sites in Haryana
Rebuilt buildings and structures in India
Tourist attractions in Haryana